Crosswicks Creek is a  tributary of the Delaware River in Burlington County, New Jersey.

Description
Crosswicks Creek watershed encompasses parts of Burlington, Mercer, Monmouth and Ocean Counties. Its headwaters flow from the Fort Dix and McGuire Air Force Base Military Reserves in a northwesterly direction and then turn sharply south where it meets the Delaware River at Bordentown Township. With jets roaring overhead and shells being test fired, the Crosswicks Creek watershed has a set of unique concerns and is the focus of many protection and restoration activities.

In the mid 1990s, the New Jersey Department of Transportation opened the missing segment of I-295, which has had a significantly impact on the mouth of the Crosswicks. This area, known as the Hamilton Marsh, has had significant portions filled in to make way for the freeway. During construction, new wetlands were also created, but at the expense of established woodlands. There may also be interference with wildlife movement patterns due to the large freeway's presence in the marsh. In light of these activities, there is support for the development of a Hamilton Marsh Greenway.

Fossils
Although most of the creek does not yield particularly abundant deposits of fossils, fossils from the Pleistocene and Cretaceous eras have been found. There exist patches of particularly fossiliferous deposits among mostly non-fossiliferous deposits throughout the creek's path.

Statistics
Length:  
Watershed Area:  
Headwaters: Fort Dix and McGuire Military Bases and Lahaway Creek in the Colliers Mill Wildlife Management Area
NJ Stream Classification: FW-1 at headwaters, FW-2 Nontrout for the rest of watershed 
Land Use: Agricultural/undeveloped, forested, urban/suburban residential, commercial, and military
Municipalities:
Allentown
Bordentown Township
Chesterfield
City of Bordentown
Fort Dix Military Reservation
Hamilton
Plumsted
New Hanover
North Hanover
Upper Freehold
Springfield

Tributaries

Bobs Run
Buck Brook
Buckhole Creek
Culvert Pond Run
Doctors Creek
Edges Brook
Ivanhoe Brook
Jumble Gut Run
Jumping Brook
Lahaway Creek
Long Bog Run
Mile Hollow Brook
North Run
South Run
Thornton Creek

Impoundments
Allentown Lake
Brindle Lake
Conines Millpond
Cookstown Pond
Gropp Lake
Hamilton Marsh
Imlaystown Lake
Oakford Lake
Prospertown Lake
Red Valley Lake

See also
List of rivers of New Jersey
Crosswicks Creek Site III

References

External links
U.S. Geological Survey: NJ stream gaging stations
Crosswicks Creek Greenway

Rivers of Burlington County, New Jersey
Rivers of Mercer County, New Jersey
Tributaries of the Delaware River
Rivers of New Jersey